The 2016 J&T Banka Prague Open was a professional tennis tournaments played on outdoor clay courts. It was the 7th edition of the tournament, and its second as part of the International category of the 2016 WTA Tour. It took place at the Sparta Prague Tennis Club in Prague, Czech Republic, from 25 to 30 April 2016.

Points distribution

Singles main draw entrants

Seeds 

 1 Rankings as of 18 April 2016.

Other entrants 
The following players received wildcards into the singles main draw:
  Jana Čepelová
  Kateřina Siniaková
  Markéta Vondroušová

The following player received entry as a special exempt:
  Stefanie Vögele

The following players received entry from the qualifying draw:
  Sorana Cîrstea
  Océane Dodin
  Vania King
  Virginie Razzano

The following players received entry as lucky losers:
  Andrea Hlaváčková
  Barbora Krejčíková 
  Tereza Smitková

Withdrawals 
Before the tournament
  Denisa Allertová → replaced by  Barbora Krejčíková
  Mona Barthel → replaced by  Ana Konjuh
  Jelena Janković → replaced by  Naomi Broady
  Daria Kasatkina → replaced by  Hsieh Su-wei
  Anett Kontaveit → replaced by  Tereza Smitková
  Danka Kovinić → replaced by  Andrea Hlaváčková
  Christina McHale → replaced by  Lucie Hradecká
  Heather Watson → replaced by  Olga Govortsova
  Roberta Vinci → replaced by  Kristýna Plíšková

Withdrawals 
During the tournament
  Svetlana Kuznetsova

Retirements 
  Lucie Hradecká

Doubles main draw entrants

Seeds 

 1 Rankings as of 18 April 2016.

Other entrants 
The following pairs received wildcards into the main draw:
  Jana Čepelová /  Viktória Kužmová
  Tereza Smitková /  Barbora Štefková

Finals

Singles 

  Lucie Šafářová defeated  Samantha Stosur, 3–6, 6–1, 6–4

Doubles 

  Margarita Gasparyan /  Andrea Hlaváčková defeated  María Irigoyen /  Paula Kania, 6–4, 6–2

External links 
 Official website

 
2016
JandT Banka Prague Open
JandT Banka